Azie Taylor Morton (February 1, 1936 – December 7, 2003) served as Treasurer of the United States during the Carter administration from September 12, 1977, to January 20, 1981. She remains the only African American to hold that office. Her signature was printed on US currency during her tenure.

Early life
Morton was born to Fleta Hazel Taylor in a rural African-American enclave called the St. John Colony in the farming community Dale, Texas.  Taylor worked as a teacher at the Crocker School for Girls, a state-sponsored school for delinquents. Taylor was not deterred by these setbacks and began to work for change.

Career
Before becoming treasurer, she served on President John F. Kennedy's Committee on Equal Employment Opportunity. From 1972 to 1976, she was a special assistant to Robert Schwarz Strauss, the chair of the Democratic National Committee. She was a member of Alpha Kappa Alpha sorority.

Personal life
Azie Taylor married James Homer Morton on May 29, 1965. The couple had two daughters, Virgie Floyd and Stacey Terry, who later brought them two granddaughters and four great-grandchildren. James Homer Morton died in January 2003.

Death and legacy
On December 6, 2003, Morton suffered a stroke at her home in Bastrop County, Texas, and she died of complications the next day.

In April 2018, Robert E. Lee Road in Austin was renamed Azie Morton Road in her honor.

References

External links
Soulciti.com: Azie Taylor Morton 1936-2003

1936 births
2003 deaths
Treasurers of the United States
African-American people
People from Caldwell County, Texas
Texas Democrats
Carter administration personnel
Huston–Tillotson University alumni